This glossary is split across multiple pages due to technical limitations.

By Alphabetical Order 
 Glossary of engineering: A–L
 Glossary of engineering: M–Z

By Category 

 Glossary of civil engineering
 Glossary of electrical and electronics engineering
 Glossary of mechanical engineering
 Glossary of structural engineering
 Glossary of aerospace engineering